The following are the winners of the 12th annual (1985) Origins Award, presented at Origins 1986:

Charles Roberts Awards

The H.G. Wells Awards

External links
 1985 Origins Awards Winners

Origins Award winners
1985 awards in the United States
Origins Award winners